Chalcoplacis is a genus of leaf beetles in the subfamily Eumolpinae. It is distributed in South America.

Species

 Chalcoplacis abstracta (Bechyné, 1954)
 Chalcoplacis amabilis (Lefèvre, 1878)
 Chalcoplacis anthrax (Bechyné, 1951)
 Chalcoplacis bicolor (Jacoby, 1900)
 Chalcoplacis bimaculata (Jacoby, 1900)
 Chalcoplacis cearensis (Bechyné, 1954)
 Chalcoplacis chopardi (Bechyné, 1954)
 Chalcoplacis confraterna (Bechyné, 1951)
 Chalcoplacis dilatata (Bechyné, 1950)
 Chalcoplacis fallax (Bechyné, 1950)
 Chalcoplacis flaveola (Jacoby, 1899)
 Chalcoplacis fulgens (Lefèvre, 1889)
 Chalcoplacis fulgida (Lefèvre, 1885)
 Chalcoplacis fulgurans (Klug, 1829)
 Chalcoplacis fulvicollis (Jacoby, 1900)
 Chalcoplacis fulvicollis aeneobadia Bechyné, 1965
 Chalcoplacis fulvicollis fulvicollis (Jacoby, 1900)
 Chalcoplacis fulvicollis laeta (Weise, 1921)
 Chalcoplacis gastrophysoides (Bechyné, 1953)
 Chalcoplacis humilis (Lefèvre, 1891)
 Chalcoplacis igneipennis (Jacoby, 1898)
 Chalcoplacis jujuyensis (Bechyné, 1954)
 Chalcoplacis medvedevi Bechyné, 1958
 Chalcoplacis nicteroyensis (Bechyné, 1951)
 Chalcoplacis ochracea (Weise, 1921)
 Chalcoplacis ochracea navigatoria Bechyné, 1958
 Chalcoplacis ochracea ochracea (Weise, 1921)
 Chalcoplacis odontorhoa Bechyné, 1965
 Chalcoplacis olivia (Bechyné, 1950)
 Chalcoplacis ovatula (Bechyné, 1954)
 Chalcoplacis pallida (Weise, 1921)
 Chalcoplacis plicipennis (Germar, 1824)
 Chalcoplacis progressa (Bechyné, 1951)
 Chalcoplacis rufotestacea (Bechyné, 1954)
 Chalcoplacis saudensis (Bechyné, 1954)
 Chalcoplacis semisericea (Bechyné, 1953)
 Chalcoplacis signata (Weise, 1921)
 Chalcoplacis speciosa (Weise, 1921)
 Chalcoplacis subcircularis (Bechyné, 1953)
 Chalcoplacis sulcaticeps (Bechyné, 1951)
 Chalcoplacis suturalis (Weise, 1921)
 Chalcoplacis tenella Bechyné, 1965
 Chalcoplacis terminata (Jacoby, 1900)
 Chalcoplacis tricolor (Fauvel, 1861)
 Chalcoplacis varians (Bechyné, 1950)
 Chalcoplacis virescens (Erichson, 1848)
 Chalcoplacis virescens despecta (Lefèvre, 1884)
 Chalcoplacis virescens impressiceps Bechyné, 1958
 Chalcoplacis virescens semifulva (Jacoby, 1900)
 Chalcoplacis virescens virescens (Erichson, 1848)

Synonyms:
 Chalcoplacis amazonica (Jacoby, 1899): moved to Anachalcoplacis
 Chalcoplacis bryanti (Bechyné, 1950): synonym of Anachalcoplacis fulva fulva (Fabricius, 1801)
 Chalcoplacis clermonti (Bechyné, 1954): moved to Anachalcoplacis
 Chalcoplacis concinna (Weise, 1921): moved to Anachalcoplacis
 Chalcoplacis costulifera (Bechyné, 1954): moved to Plaumannita
 Chalcoplacis fulva (Fabricius, 1801): moved to Anachalcoplacis
 Chalcoplacis inermis (Bowditch, 1921): moved back to Hermesia
 Chalcoplacis ludicra (Bechyné, 1954): moved to Plaumannita
 Chalcoplacis pohli (Bechyné, 1951): synonym of Chalcoplacis fulgens (Lefèvre, 1889)
 Chalcoplacis striola Bechyné & Bechyné, 1961: moved to Marajoarinha
 Chalcoplacis subunicolor (Bechyné, 1953): synonym of Anachalcoplacis fulva fulva (Fabricius, 1801)
 Chalcoplacis subunicolor macrosoma Bechyné, 1958: synonym of Anachalcoplacis fulva macrosoma (Bechyné, 1958)
 Chalcoplacis subunicolor melanitarsis Bechyné, 1958: synonym of Anachalcoplacis fulva melanitarsis (Bechyné, 1958)

References

Eumolpinae
Chrysomelidae genera
Beetles of South America
Taxa named by Louis Alexandre Auguste Chevrolat